Fatwa is a 2006 American dramatic thriller film starring Lauren Holly.

Plot
Junior Senator Maggie Davidson's hard-line anti-terrorism policy makes her the target for a sleeper cell of murderous Jihadist terrorists who plant a dirty bomb at the Mall of America in Bloomington, Minnesota.

Cast
 Lauren Holly as Maggie Davidson
 Lacey Chabert as Noa Goldman
 John Doman as John Davidson
 Roger Guenveur Smith as Samir Al-Faied
 Angus Macfadyen as Bobby
 Rachel Miner as Cassie Davidson
 Jayson Warner Smith as Teacher

References

External links
 
 

American action thriller films
American political thriller films
Films about terrorism in the United States
Films about jihadism
2006 films
2006 action thriller films
2000s English-language films
2000s American films